Ai no Gakko Cuore Monogatari is an anime television series, based on the 1886 novel Cuore, Libro per i Ragazzi (Heart: An Italian Schoolboy's Journal) by Edmondo de Amicis. It first aired from 3 April to 2 October 1981.

The series has been broadcast into some countries, It has been dubbed in French, Italian, Spanish, Catalan, Polish, Arabic, and Persian.

Story

The story takes place in nineteenth century in Turin, Italy. The events in the anime are based on Enrico Bottini's Journal. The boys in early adolescence, innocent and susceptible, meet a teacher of virtue. He tells them honorable and heart-warming stories with which the boys feel great empathy. After experiencing hard times and sharing various joys with their friends and family, the boys recognize what is most important of all: to love others.

Voice cast

Toshiko Fujita as Enrico Bottini
Katsue Miwa as Nino Bottini

Episode list

Music

References

External links
 Cuore in IMDB
 

1981 anime television series debuts
School life in anime and manga
Television shows set in Italy
1981 Japanese television series endings
Nippon Animation
Mainichi Broadcasting System original programming
Television shows based on Italian novels
Works based on Heart (novel)
Drama anime and manga
Historical anime and manga